The 2014–15 Arizona State Sun Devils men's basketball team represented Arizona State University during the 2014–15 NCAA Division I men's basketball season. The Sun Devils were led by ninth-year head coach Herb Sendek and played their home games at the Wells Fargo Arena in Tempe, Arizona. They were members of the Pac-12 Conference. They finished the regular season 17–14, 9–9 in Pac-12 play to finish in a tie for fifth place. The Sun Devils lost in the first round of the Pac-12 tournament to USC. ASU was invited to the National Invitation Tournament where they won at UConn in the first round, before losing in the second round at Richmond.

Following their exit from the NIT, head coach Herb Sendek was fired.

Previous season 
The Sun Devils finished the 2013–14 season with an overall record of 21–12, 10–8 in Pac-12 play to finish in a five-way tie for third place. In the Pac-12 tournament, the Sun Devils were defeated by Stanford in the quarterfinals. The Sun Devils received an at-large bid to the NCAA tournament as a #10 seed in the Midwest Region where they lost to Texas in the Round of 64.

Off season

Departures

Incoming Transfers

2014 Recruiting Class

Notes
– On April 18, it was announced that senior forward Shaquielle McKissic was granted a sixth year of eligibility by the NCAA.

Roster

Schedule

|-
!colspan=12 style="background:#990033; color:#FFB310;"| Non-conference regular season

|-
!colspan=12 style="background:#990033;"| Pac-12 regular season

  

|-
!colspan=12 style="background:#990033;"| Pac-12 tournament

|-
!colspan=12 style="background:#990033;"| NIT

References

Arizona State Sun Devils men's basketball seasons
Arizona State
Arizona State
Arizona State Sun Devils men's basketball
Arizona State Sun Devils men's basketball